The Garaynbal, also written Karingbal, are an Aboriginal Australian people of the state of Queensland. They spoke a dialect of Biri called Garaynbal, now extinct.

Country
They ran south from beneath Rolleston as far as the Carnarvon Range. Their western frontier lay at Consuelo Peak, while their eastern limits ran to Expedition Range and Bedourie.

Social organisation
According to an early source, the tribe was divided into four exogamous intermarrying classes.

Alternative names
 Karingbool
 Kaingbul
 Karranbal

Notes

Citations

Sources

Aboriginal peoples of Queensland